Tobin Powell Heath (born May 29, 1988) is an American professional soccer player who plays as a forward for OL Reign of the NWSL, as well as the United States national team. Heath has been described as "perhaps the USA's most skillful player" by the United States Soccer Federation, and she was voted the U.S. Soccer Athlete of the Year in 2016.

Heath played college soccer for the University of North Carolina Tar Heels and helped the team win three NCAA Division I Women's Soccer Championships. Professionally, Heath has played for the New Jersey Wildcats in 2004–05, Hudson Valley Quickstrike Lady Blues in 2007 and Pali Blues in 2009, Atlanta Beat, Sky Blue FC, and New York Fury of Women's Professional Soccer as well as Paris Saint-Germain in France and for both Manchester United and Arsenal in the English FA Women's Super League. She has won two NWSL Championships with her former team Portland Thorns.

Heath won gold with the national team at the 2008 Beijing Summer Olympics, 2012 London Summer Olympics, 2015 FIFA Women's World Cup, and 2019 FIFA Women's World Cup and she played for the team at the 2011 FIFA Women's World Cup where the U.S. finished in second place.

In 2020, Heath was named to the FIFA FIFPro Women's World11.

Early life and education
Heath was born in Morristown, New Jersey, to parents Jeff and Cindy Heath. She grew up in Basking Ridge, New Jersey. Heath has a younger brother, Jeffrey, and two older sisters, Perry and Katie, who are active in Athletes in Action and Champions for Christ. Heath started playing soccer at the age of 4 in the back of a YMCA. She has described herself as a proud and devout follower of the Christian faith and is very close to her family.

Heath graduated from Ridge High School in Basking Ridge in 2006, where she played soccer for three years. She also played for the 2003 Club National Champion PDA Wildcats team. Heath was ranked as the No. 2 recruit in the nation in the Class of 2006 by Soccer Buzz magazine and was named to the Parade Magazine All-America team in 2005.

North Carolina Tar Heels

Heath committed to attend the University of North Carolina (UNC) when she was due to begin her junior year at high school. She did not play soccer in her senior year, instead she decided to train with boys. In her consensus freshman year in 2006 with the Tar Heels, she was part of the All-America 2006 national championship team and made 23 appearances at left midfield (22 of them were starts), scoring four goals and assisting nine. As a sophomore, she scored two goals, assisting another five, and was named to the First-Team NSCAA All-American and First-Team All-ACC (Atlantic Coast Conference). As a junior, she scored eight goals with eight assists, this helped the UNC to a 25–1–2 record and the NCAA title.

As a senior at UNC, she was involved in fifteen Tar Heels goals, five of them she scored and assisted 10. The team compiled a record of 23–3–1 and recorded 1–0 victories in both the NCAA semi-final and championship game. She was named to the NCAA All-Tournament Team and also the first runner-up for the MAC Hermann Trophy, given to the college soccer's top player.

Heath helped lead UNC to NCAA Division I Women's Soccer Championship titles in 2006, 2008 and 2009 and four straight Atlantic Coast Conference titles. UNC soccer coach Anson Dorrance notes that Heath preferred to nutmeg opposing players rather than dribble the ball around them.

Club career

USL W-League (2004–2009)
From 2004 to 2006 Heath played with the New Jersey Wildcats, then known as the PSA Wildcats, where she helped the team win the USL W-League Championship in 2005 and be crowned USL W-League Runners-Up in 2004, after assisting the team in becoming Champions of the USL W-League Northeast Division in 2004, 2005, and 2006. The next year she played for Hudson Valley Quickstrike Lady Blues, the team finished the season second in their division and made it to the 2007 Conference Semifinal. In 2009 she played one season with California's Pali Blues, who went on to win the USL W-League Western Conference title and the W-League Championship title.

Women's Professional Soccer (2010–11)
In 2010, she was the first overall pick in the Women's Professional Soccer (WPS) 2010 college draft and was selected by the expansion team Atlanta Beat. After suffering an injury to her right ankle in her third appearance for the Beat, she missed the remainder of the 2010 season. She started in all three of her appearances for the club.

On December 10, 2010, Heath, along with Beat teammates Eniola Aluko and Angie Kerr, were traded to Sky Blue FC in return for the fourth and eighth pick in the 2011 WPS Draft as well as future considerations. Heath made twelve appearances for Sky Blue, starting in three games. The team finished fifth during regular season play with 5 wins, 4 draws, and 9 losses.

New York Fury (2012)
With the folding of WPS in 2012, Heath joined New York Fury of the WPSL Elite League. At the start of the season, she was recovering from an ankle injury. Afterwards, she played one game with New York Fury and was later called to the national team.

Paris Saint-Germain (2013–2014)

In 2013, Heath signed a six-month contract with Paris Saint-Germain (PSG) in the top-tier French league, Division 1 Féminine until the end of the season on May 23, 2013. She scored five goals in the twelve appearances she made for the club. Her six-month spell was referred as her education, from the Portland Thorns FC website.

Heath returned to PSG from Portland Thorns FC in September 2013 until June 2014, after she had a sore right foot in the 2013 NWSL Championship. During her second spell with the club, she made seven appearances without scoring.

Portland Thorns FC (2013–2020)

The newly established National Women's Soccer League (NWSL) announced on January 11, 2013 that Heath was one of the seven players allocated to the Portland Thorns FC for their initial roster as part of the NWSL Player Allocation. After completing the season with Paris-Saint Germain, she joined the Thorns in July 2013, helping them attain a third-place finish in the NWSL. The Thorns won the 2013 NWSL Championship after defeating the Western New York Flash 2–0, with Heath scoring the game-winning goal from a direct free kick. She was voted as the Most Valuable Player (MVP) of the championship game.

During the beginning of the 2016 NWSL season, Heath notched five assists in five games – two of them in a 2–1 victory over the Orlando Pride, and earned the title of NWSL Player of the Month for April. She also scored her first goal of the 2016 season against the Washington Spirit, which was voted NWSL goal of the week by fans. She was also named NWSL Player of the Week for week 6. Heath notched her 10th assist of the season in Portland's final game against Sky Blue FC, breaking the NWSL's previous record of 9 assists by a single player in one regular season. She was named as the team's captain when Christine Sinclair was injured during the season.

Heath missed the majority of the 2017 NWSL season, while nursing a lingering back injury which kept her out of play. It was first described as a minor injury that was expected to result in a short spell out of play, with an estimated return date listed as May 27 against the Boston Breakers. The back injury lasted longer than thought so she was sent to Los Angeles and was treated by her coaching staff. Heath was removed from the disabled list and added to the active roster on August 28. It was announced in May that she would take up a role within the team's Development Academy as Youth Technical Director. Heath returned in time for end of the season, her NWSL season debut was on September 23 vs Orlando Pride at the 60th minute. She made her first start on October 7 against the same team in the NWSL Championship Semi-final. She helped her team reach the final of the play-offs with an assist for Emily Sonnett in a 4–1 win, and participated in a 1–0 win over North Carolina Courage to win the NWSL Championship.

Heath suffered an ankle injury during the 2017 NWSL Championship game and underwent surgery at the beginning of 2018. She missed the first four games of the 2018 NWSL season as she was still recovering from surgery. Heath returned to the Thorns lineup on April 28 against the Utah Royals, where she entered the game in the 57th minute and scored a goal 10 minutes later. The game ended in a 1–1 draw. Heath scored 7 goals and added 7 assists during the regular season. She was named to the NWSL Team of the Month for August. Heath scored another goal in Portland's 2–1 win over the Seattle Reign in the semi-final, setting up a re-match with the North Carolina Courage in the final. Portland was defeated by the Courage 3–0 in the final. Heath was named one of five nominees for NWSL Most Valuable Player, her Thorns teammate Lindsay Horan won the award. Heath was named to the 2018 NWSL Best XI.

Heath started the 2019 season by winning both the NWSL Goal of the Week and Player of the Week for the first week of play.

With the 2020 season disrupted by the COVID-19 pandemic, Heath elected not to participate in the 2020 NWSL Challenge Cup.

On November 12, 2020, having left Heath unprotected, Portland lost her NWSL rights to Racing Louisville FC during the 2020 NWSL Expansion Draft.

Manchester United (2020–2021)
On September 9, 2020, Manchester United of the FA Women's Super League announced it had signed Heath, along with her national teammate Christen Press, to one-year contracts. She made her debut on October 4 as a 70th minute substitute in a 3–0 victory over Brighton & Hove Albion, registering an assist. She scored her first goal for the club on October 18 as part of a 4–2 WSL victory away to West Ham United. On November 14, Heath scored her first Manchester derby goal in a 2–2 league draw with Manchester City, helping start United's comeback from 0–2 down. On December 11, 2020, Heath was named WSL Player of the Month for November.

On December 17, 2020, Heath, was named to FIFA FIFPro Women's World11 at The Best FIFA Football Awards 2020.

Having been sidelined by an ankle injury since January 2021, it was announced in April that Heath had since suffered a further knee injury and had returned to the United States to try and rehab in time for the summer's Olympic Games, prematurely ending her debut season with United. On June 24, the club announced Heath would leave upon the expiry of her contract at the end of the month.

Arsenal (2021–2022)
On September 3, 2021, Heath signed for Arsenal. She made her debut as a substitute at home against Manchester City on September 26, 2021, during Arsenal's 5–0 victory.

Having been ruled out for the conclusion of the season with a minor hamstring injury sustained in training, Heath and Arsenal mutually agreed to terminate her contract early on April 28, 2022.

OL Reign (2022–)
On June 16, 2022, Heath returned to the NWSL and signed with OL Reign.

International career

Youth national teams
Heath played on several youth national teams – including the U-16s in 2003–2004 and the U-17s in 2004–05. Heath was a standout at the 2006 FIFA U-20 Women's World Championship in Russia, despite being of the last players chosen for the World Cup roster. In total Heath made 24 appearances for the United States under-20s in 2006, scoring five goals. Heath was part of the silver medal-winning USA Women's team at the 2007 Pan American Games in Brazil where she was in the starting lineup for the championship game.

Senior national team debut, 2008
Heath made her first appearance for the senior national team on January 18, 2008, against Finland in the Four Nations Tournament in China. She was named to the U.S roster for 2008 Summer Olympics at the age of 20. She earned three caps during the tournament as the U.S went on to win the gold medal. Heath was one of three college athletes who represented the U.S. at the 2008 Olympics. In 2008, Heath earned 17 caps and scored two goals. Her first international goal came against China at the 2008 Algarve Cup.

2009–2010
Heath was named the 2009 U.S. Soccer Young Female Athlete of the Year and earned two more caps for the USWNT in 2009, both appearances came against Canada in July. She did not play for the US in 2010 due to an illness and a major ankle injury suffered during the WPS season which required surgery.

2011 FIFA Women's World Cup
Heath made her FIFA Women's World Cup debut at the age of 23 during the 2011 FIFA Women's World Cup in Germany. Her first appearance came in the second half of U.S's group-stage match against Colombia. Heath made four appearances during the World Cup, her final three appearances came in the knockout round. In the World Cup final, Heath entered the game in the 116th minute of extra time as a substitute for Megan Rapinoe. The game finished tied 2–2 and went to penalties. Heath was the third U.S player to take a penalty, but her shot was saved by Japanese keeper Ayumi Kaihori and the U.S lost 3–1 on penalties.

2012 London Olympics
Heath was a member of the 2012 U.S. Olympic team and played in all six matches. She started and played the full 90 in four of the six games and recorded three assists during the tournament. Her first assist came against France, during the groups stage, where she sent a crossing pass to Alex Morgan who scored the last goal of the match making the final score 4–2. The second assist, against Colombia, she played a one-two pass with Wambach who scored the second in a 3–0 win. Her final assist of the tournament came in the quarter-finals against New Zealand, at the 87th minute, when she provided a long ball down the left flank to Sydney Leroux, who scored through the legs of the goalkeeper Jenny Bindon, sealing the match at the final score of 2–0.

2015 FIFA Women's World Cup
Heath was a regular starter on the U.S. National Women's Team at the 2015 FIFA Women's World Cup in Canada, starting five of the U.S.'s seven games. In the World Cup Final, Heath scored in the 54th minute, on an assist from Morgan Brian. The U.S won the World Cup by defeating Japan 5–2

2016 Rio Olympics
Heath scored two goals during 2016 Olympic qualifying, helping the United States to qualify for the 2016 Summer Olympics.

Heath participated in her third Olympic Games in 2016. She appeared in three games for the U.S and recorded two assists. The U.S team was eliminated by Sweden on penalties in the quarter-finals. Heath was named NWSL Olympics Player of Match Day 1 and 2 in fan voting.

In 2016 Heath appeared in 20 games for the U.S, she scored 6 goals and added 8 assists. Heath was named 2016 U.S Soccer Female Player of the Year after receiving 40% of the vote, ahead of Crystal Dunn with 34%.

2017
After appearing in all three games at the 2017 SheBelieves Cup, Heath would only make one more appearance for the U.S in 2017 due to a nagging back injury and an ankle injury suffered in the 2017 NWSL Championship game.

2018
After undergoing ankle surgery in January 2018, Heath made her return to the field on June 12 in a friendly against China, where she scored the match-winner in a 2–1 victory. At the 2018 Tournament of Nations Heath scored in the final game against Brazil, helping the U.S to a 4–1 victory. The U.S won the tournament by goal differential over Australia.

Heath scored 4 goals at the 2018 CONCACAF Women's Championship, which included two goals in a semi-final match against Jamaica. The U.S won that game 6–0 and clinched a spot in the 2019 FIFA Women's World Cup. She was named to the Best XI for the CONCACAF Women's Championship.

Heath finished 2018 with 7 goals and 6 assists, while only appearing in 10 games. She was one of five nominees for the 2018 U.S Female Player of the Year, Alex Morgan won the award.

2019 FIFA Women's World Cup
In May 2019, Heath was named to the squad for the 2019 FIFA Women's World Cup. She started six of the seven matches as the United States became only the second nation after Germany in 2007 to successfully defend the title.

Career statistics

Club summary

International goals
 As of match played September 16, 2021. United States score listed first, score column indicates score after each Heath goal.

Honors and awards
University of North Carolina
NCAA Women's Soccer Champions: 2006, 2008, 2009
Portland Thorns
NWSL Championship: 2013, 2017
NWSL Shield: 2016

OL Reign
 NWSL Shield: 2022
 The Women's Cup: 2022

International
FIFA Women's World Cup: 2015, 2019, runner-up: 2011
Olympic Gold Medal: 2008, 2012
Olympic Bronze Medal: 2020
 CONCACAF Women's Championship: 2014, 2018
 CONCACAF Women's Olympic Qualifying Tournament: 2008, 2012, 2016, 2020
Algarve Cup: 2008, 2011, 2013, 2015
Four Nations Tournament: 2008, 2011
She Believes Cup: 2016; 2020
Tournament of Nations: 2018

Individual
FIFA FIFPro Women's World11: 2020
U.S. Soccer Female Athlete of the Year: 2016
NWSL Best XI: 2016, 2018, 2019  
NWSL 2013 Championship MVP
FA Women's Super League Player of the Month: November 2020
U.S. Soccer Young Female Athlete of the Year: 2009
IFFHS CONCACAF Woman Team of the Decade 2011–2020

Personal life
Heath has identified as a devout Christian. Aside from soccer, Heath has said she enjoyed playing multiple sports, such as tennis and surfing, and enjoyed being outside when given the time and opportunity. Heath's first name is her great-grandmother's surname.

Heath co-owns the clothing company re—inc, along with Christen Press, Megan Rapinoe, and Meghan Klingenberg. 

In June 2022, Heath shared a photo on her Instagram account of a painting she had produced for sale at re—inc titled Out Now, which depicted the words "I am gay" spelled out in large, multi-colored all caps block letters.

In popular culture

Video games
Heath is featured along with her national teammates in the EA Sports' FIFA video game series in FIFA 16, the first time women players were included in the game. In September 2015, she was ranked by EA Sports as the No. 15 women's player in the game.

See also
 List of FIFA Women's World Cup winning players
 List of multiple Olympic gold medalists in one event
 List of Olympic medalists in football
 List of players who have won multiple FIFA Women's World Cups
 List of players who have appeared in multiple FIFA Women's World Cups
 List of Portland Thorns FC players
 List of foreign FA Women's Super League players
 List of University of North Carolina at Chapel Hill alumni 
 List of sportswomen

References

External links

Portland Thorns player profile
Team USA player profile
2011 FIFA Women's World Cup player profile
Tobin Heath on the NWSL soccer website

Living people
1988 births
Pali Blues players
Atlanta Beat (WPS) players
NJ/NY Gotham FC players
United States women's international soccer players
North Carolina Tar Heels women's soccer players
Footballers at the 2008 Summer Olympics
Footballers at the 2012 Summer Olympics
Footballers at the 2016 Summer Olympics
Footballers at the 2020 Summer Olympics
Olympic gold medalists for the United States in soccer
Parade High School All-Americans (girls' soccer)
American women's soccer players
Footballers at the 2007 Pan American Games
2011 FIFA Women's World Cup players
2015 FIFA Women's World Cup players
USL W-League (1995–2015) players
Soccer players from New Jersey
Portland Thorns FC players
Women's Premier Soccer League Elite players
Medalists at the 2012 Summer Olympics
Medalists at the 2008 Summer Olympics
Paris Saint-Germain Féminine players
Expatriate women's footballers in France
FIFA Women's World Cup-winning players
Women's association football midfielders
Sportspeople from Somerset County, New Jersey
FIFA Century Club
Pan American Games silver medalists for the United States
National Women's Soccer League players
United States women's under-20 international soccer players
Pan American Games medalists in football
New Jersey Wildcats players
Division 1 Féminine players
American expatriate sportspeople in France
2019 FIFA Women's World Cup players
Ridge High School alumni
Manchester United W.F.C. players
Women's Super League players
American expatriate sportspeople in England
Medalists at the 2007 Pan American Games
Olympic bronze medalists for the United States in soccer
Medalists at the 2020 Summer Olympics
Arsenal W.F.C. players
Women's Professional Soccer players